École des Deux-Rives is a French first language school located in Mission, British Columbia, Canada.

External links
http://deuxrives.csf.bc.ca/

Elementary schools in British Columbia
French-language schools in British Columbia
High schools in British Columbia
Educational institutions in Canada with year of establishment missing